Guo Xinxin (born August 2, 1983) is a Chinese aerial skier who competed in the 2002 Winter Olympics and the 2006 Winter Olympics. She competed for China at the 2010 Winter Olympics as well and won the bronze medal in the aerials event.

References

External links 
 
 
 
 
 

1983 births
Living people
Chinese female freestyle skiers
Olympic bronze medalists for China
Olympic medalists in freestyle skiing
Olympic freestyle skiers of China
Freestyle skiers at the 2002 Winter Olympics
Freestyle skiers at the 2006 Winter Olympics
Freestyle skiers at the 2010 Winter Olympics
Medalists at the 2010 Winter Olympics
Freestyle skiers at the 2007 Asian Winter Games
Skiers from Shenyang
21st-century Chinese women